Albania competed in the Junior Eurovision Song Contest 2022, which was held on 11 December 2022 in Yerevan, Armenia. Kejtlin Gjata was selected to represent the country with the song "Pakëz diell (A Bit of Sunlight)" through the national selection competition , organised on 25 October 2022 by Radio Televizioni Shqiptar (RTSH).

Background 

Prior to the 2021 contest, Albania had participated in the Junior Eurovision Song Contest six times since its first entry in 2012, only opting not to participate at the 2013, 2014 and 2020 contests. Albania has never won the contest, with their best result being in 2015, with the song "" by Mishela Rapo achieving fifth place with a score of 93 points. In , Anna Gjebrea represented Albania in Paris, France with the song "Stand By You". The country ended in 14th place out of 19 countries, achieving 84 points.

Before Junior Eurovision

Junior Fest 2022 
The Albanian broadcaster Radio Televizioni Shqiptar (RTSH) revealed in July 2022 that the Albanian representative will be chosen via the national selection competition .

Competing entries 
Interested artists from Albania and Kosovo were able to send in their applications, starting from 20 July 2022 until 5 September 2022. Only the final versions of the entries were accepted. The 20 participating acts were revealed on 28 September 2022, but the list was later cut down to 18 acts.

Final 
The final took place in the Gjon Simoni Hall in Tirana and was broadcast on 25 October 2022 on 18:00 CET. The winner was solely selected by a jury panel consisting of: Kejsi Tola (Albanian representative in the Eurovision Song Contest 2009), Efi Gjika (Albanian representative in the Junior Eurovision Song Contest 2018) and Anna Gjebrea (Albanian representative in the Junior Eurovision Song Contest 2021). In addition to the performances of the competing entries, Anna Gjebrea performed her new single "Throwback" as the interval act.

At Junior Eurovision 
After the opening ceremony, which took place on 5 December 2022, it was announced that Albania would perform seventh on 11 December 2022, following France and preceding Georgia.

Voting

Detailed voting results

References 

Albania
2022
Junior Eurovision Song Contest